Myrcia johnstonii is a species of plant in the family Myrtaceae. It is endemic to Panama. It is also known as Calyptranthes johnstonii McVaugh (basionym).

References

Endemic flora of Panama
johnstonii
Taxonomy articles created by Polbot